Manjhi – The Mountain Man is a 2015 Indian Hindi-language biographical film based on the life of Dashrath Manjhi. The film is directed by Ketan Mehta, jointly produced by Viacom 18 Motion Pictures and NFDC India. Upon release the film received positive critical acclaim.

Nawazuddin Siddiqui enacted the role of Dashrath Manjhi, while Radhika Apte played Manjhi's wife. The film was released worldwide on 21 August 2015. Prior to its release preview copy of movie leaked on the web on 10 August 2015. The Bandra-Kurla Complex (BKC) cyber police station had registered a case against few accused of leaking the movie. The Bihar State Government declared the film tax-free on 30 July 2015.

Plot 
In the 1960s Dashrath Manjhi (Nawazuddin Siddiqui) lived in a small village Gehlaur near Gaya, Bihar, India with his family including his wife Phaguniya Devi (Radhika Apte) and his son. There was a rocky mountain near his village that people either had to climb across or travel round to gain access to medical care at the nearest town Wazirganj. One day Manjhi's wife (when pregnant) fell while trying to cross the mountain and eventually died giving birth to a girl, after which Manjhi decided to carve a road through it. When he started hammering the hill people called him a lunatic but that only steeled his resolve further. After 22 years of back-breaking labour, Manjhi carved a path 360 feet long, 25 feet deep in places and 30 feet wide.

Manjhi died in 2007. The film's postscript states that 52 years after he started breaking the mountain, 30 years after he finished and 4 years after his death the government finally made a metalled road to Gehlaur in 2011.
He fought with the Indian government for the development of their village and for the availability of hospitals and road.

Cast 
 Nawazuddin Siddiqui as Dashrath Manjhi
 Radhika Apte as Phaguniya-Dashrath's wife
 Sneha Pallavi as Phaguniya's Mother
 Tigmanshu Dhulia as Mukhiya (landlord)
 Pankaj Tripathi as Ruab (the landlord's son)
 Gaurav Dwivedi as Alok Jha (a journalist)
 Urmila Mahanta as Lauki
 Ashraful Haque as Magru-Dashrath's father
 Jagat Rawat as Shuklaji
 Varadraj Swami as Gopal's Father
 Deepa Sahi as Prime Minister Indira Gandhi
 Prashant Narayanan as Jhumru
 Rashaana Shah as Bhanwari

Soundtrack

Critical reception 
Sweta Kaushal of Hindustan Times termed the film an inspiring, touching tale of a common man and gave the film 4.5 stars out of 5. Saibal Chatterjee of NDTV gave the film 3 stars. Meena Iyer of Times of India gave it 3 stars. Bollywood Hungama gave it 2.5 stars. Shubhra Gupta of Indian Express gave it two stars.

References

External links 
 
 

2015 films
Films about Indian slavery
2010s Hindi-language films
Indian nonlinear narrative films
Films about poverty in India
Indian films based on actual events
Drama films based on actual events
Films about social issues in India
Discrimination in fiction
Films about the caste system in India
Films shot in Bihar
Films set in Bihar
Viacom18 Studios films
2015 biographical drama films
Indian biographical drama films